This list of fictional brewers includes characters in literature, film, and television that work at breweries and/or homebrew as well as fictional breweries.

Television

Film

References

 
 Fictional